I20, I 20 or I-20 may refer to:
 Interstate 20, a highway in the southeastern United States
 I-20 (form), a United States government document that provides supporting information for the issuance of a student visa or change of status
 I-20 (rapper) (born 1975), American rapper
 I-20 (sailing scow), a sloop rigged scow with a spinnaker
 I2O, a defunct computer I/O specification
 Hyundai i20, a car
 , a Type C submarine
 Kalmar Regiment (1816–1892), a Swedish infantry regiment
 Västerbotten Regiment (1893–1973), a Swedish infantry regiment

See also 
 L20 (disambiguation)